Apache CXF is an open source software project developing a Web services framework. It originated as the combination of Celtix developed by IONA Technologies and XFire developed by a team hosted at Codehaus in 2006. These two projects were combined at the Apache Software Foundation. The name "CXF" was derived by combining "Celtix" and "XFire".

Description
CXF is often used with Apache ServiceMix, Apache Camel and Apache ActiveMQ in service-oriented architecture (SOA) infrastructure projects.

Apache CXF supports the Java programming interfaces JAX-WS, JAX-RS, JBI, JCA, JMX, JMS over SOAP, Spring, and the XML data binding frameworks JAXB, Aegis, Apache XMLBeans, SDO.

CXF includes the following:
Web Services Standards Support:
SOAP
WS-Addressing
WS-Policy
WS-ReliableMessaging
WS-SecureConversation
WS-Security
WS-SecurityPolicy
JAX-WS API for Web service development
Java-first support
WSDL-first tooling
JAX-RS (JSR 339 2.0) API for RESTful Web service development
JavaScript programming model for service and client development
Maven tooling
CORBA support
HTTP, JMS and WebSocket transport layers
Embeddable Deployment:
ServiceMix or other JBI containers
Geronimo or other Java EE containers
Tomcat or other servlet containers
OSGi
Reference OSGi Remote Services implementation

See also

The Axis Web Services framework
Apache Wink, a project in incubation with JAX-RS support
List of web service frameworks

References

External links
Apache CXF website

CXF
Web services
Web service specifications
Web applications
Java enterprise platform
Java (programming language) libraries